Halls Bluff or Hall's Bluff is an unincorporated community in Houston County, Texas, on the Trinity River.

References

Houston County, Texas
Unincorporated communities in Texas